KGCA-LP (106.9 FM) is a radio station licensed to serve Tumon, in the United States territory of Guam.  The station is owned by KGCA Inc. It aired a Variety format until January 15, 2009, when it began broadcasting Christian programming.

The station was assigned the KGCA-LP call letters by the Federal Communications Commission on September 1, 2006.

References

External links
Melodies Of Prayer

 
 
KGCA-LP service area per the FCC database

Low-power FM radio stations in the United States
Radio stations established in 2006
2006 establishments in Guam
Seventh-day Adventist media
GCA-LP
Tumon, Guam